The 1933 Florida–Mexico hurricane was the first of two Atlantic hurricanes to strike the Treasure Coast region of Florida in the very active 1933 Atlantic hurricane season. It was one of two storms that year to inflict hurricane-force winds over South Texas, causing significant damage there; the other occurred in early September. The fifth tropical cyclone of the year, it formed east of the Lesser Antilles on July 24, rapidly strengthening as it moved west-northwest. As it passed over the islands, it attained hurricane status on July 26, producing heavy rains and killing at least six people. Over the next three days, it moved north of the Caribbean, paralleling the Turks and Caicos Islands and the Bahamas. The storm produced extensive damage and at least one drowning as it crossed the Bahamas. On July 29, the cyclone came under the influence of changing steering currents in the atmosphere, which forced the storm into Florida near Hobe Sound a day later. A minimal hurricane at landfall, it caused negligible wind damage as it crossed Florida, but generated heavy rains along its path, causing locally severe flooding. The storm turned west, weakened to below hurricane status, and later exited the state north of Charlotte Harbor on July 31.

Once over the eastern Gulf of Mexico, the storm shifted its course to the west-southwest and gradually recovered its intensity. The path of the storm brought it close to the mouth of the Rio Grande in early August. Few ships encountered the small storm as it regained hurricane status on August 4, just a day before striking northern Mexico with winds of —making it close to a modern-day Category 2 hurricane on the Saffir–Simpson hurricane wind scale. Striking close to the border between the United States and Mexico, the storm caused extensive damage in both countries. Winds damaged buildings and crops in Tamaulipas and the southern regions of Texas, with heavy losses to citrus production in the Rio Grande Valley. While only one person died in the United States, heavy rains led to catastrophic flooding that claimed at least 31 lives in northern Mexico; the worst-hit areas were in and near the city of Monterrey. While monetary losses in Mexico were unclear, the storm did at least $3,000,000 in damages in the United States, measured in contemporary U.S. dollars.

Historical context
This storm overshadowed memories of the earlier hurricane, and would be remembered as among the worst on the Treasure Coast as late as the 1980s. The occurrence of two hurricanes on the east coast of Florida in the same season is a relatively rare event in historical records, but not unprecedented: for instance, forensic research by weather historian David M. Ludlum suggests that two or more hurricanes in 1837 may have affected the region. Citing reports from William Reid in Law of Storms (1838), Ludlum noted that two hurricanes affected Central and Northeast Florida on August 1–2 and September 6, respectively, while other storms, potentially hurricanes, may have done so later in September. The September hurricane struck between St. Augustine and Jacksonville. Incidentally, the 1837 Atlantic hurricane season was apparently very active, like 1933; as in 2004, a record four hurricanes hit the state of Florida, including the infamous Racer's hurricane in October.

Meteorological history

Prior to reanalysis in 2012, official records indicated formation at 12:00 UTC on July 25; however, examination of observations from ships and land stations revealed a closed low a day earlier. Upon generation, the depression moved generally west-northwest, toward the eastern Caribbean, becoming a tropical storm at 00:00 UTC on July 25. However, ships and weather stations did not observe gales until later that day, so the winds in HURDAT were interpolated, but based on available data, the storm strengthened steadily.

On its west-northwest course, the storm—now equivalent to a Category 1 hurricane—missed Puerto Rico to its northeast. The hurricane gradually bent to the northwest as it followed the arc of the eastern Bahamas. During this time, the storm turned to the west-northwest, nearing the east coast of Florida; this was likely due to a robust subtropical ridge in the area.

Based on ship reports, the storm made its only landfall in the United States on Jupiter Island, between Port Salerno and Hobe Sound, Florida, around 16:00 UTC on July 30. While this supported winds of only tropical storm force, the storm had a small radius of outermost closed isobar embedded in a ridge of high pressure, so winds in Florida were deemed to be , affirming earlier reports that listed the storm as a hurricane at landfall. After landfall, the storm weakened to a tropical storm and moved slowly westward across the south-central peninsula, passing over the northern end of Lake Okeechobee early on July 31.

From this point, few ships were near the center of the storm with which to accurately discern its location and intensity, though data on August 1–2 confirmed a weaker cyclone than earlier. At 00:00 UTC on August 1, the storm began a persistent west-southwest motion that continued for the rest of its life cycle. Based on this pressure, reanalysis inferred that the storm began gradually restrengthening a day earlier, reaching  at the time of the reading. Although the storm regained hurricane status at 00:00 UTC on August 4, due to the sparsity of ship data, weather forecasters at the time assumed the storm only contained gale-force winds. For a day, the storm briefly angled to the west as it neared the Mexico–United States border, reaching its final and strongest peak of  late on August 4. Anemometers in Brownsville, Texas, verified a landfall near Playa Lauro Villar, Tamaulipas, just south of the Rio Grande, near 01:00 UTC on August 5. Now hooking west-southwest, the storm quickly atrophied as it moved inland and vanished over easternmost Nuevo León by 18:00 UTC on August 5.

Preparations
Although the storm affected several Caribbean islands, the Turks and Caicos, and the Bahamas, preparations there, if any, were unclear. Residents across Puerto Rico boarded up windows and secured roofs in anticipation of damaging winds. Governor Robert Hayes Gore placed the Hurricane Relief Organization and Red Cross on standby. As the storm neared Florida, the United States Weather Bureau—later the National Weather Service—posted storm warnings between Miami and Titusville. These were later extended to include the west coast of the state from Punta Rassa to Tarpon Springs. At the time, forecasters were unaware that the storm was of hurricane status; this unawareness extended to the storm's passage over the Gulf of Mexico. Forecasters only issued storm warnings for part of the Texas coast, including the cities of Brownsville and Freeport.

Upon news of the storm, businesses in West Palm Beach boarded up vulnerable, expensive plate glass windows. Fearing flooding, authorities were empowered by Florida governor David Sholtz to evacuate over 4,200–5,000 residents, most of whom were black farm workers, from low-lying areas around Lake Okeechobee to elevated locations. Most of the evacuees left by train, prompted by fears of washouts on the track beds. A day before the storm, the lake level reached , heightening officials' concerns about flooding and spurring the evacuations. Several railway companies lent free transport to their passengers, and trains were conveniently stationed around the lake. The evacuations took place in the communities of Belle Glade, Pahokee, Canal Point, Okeechobee, and Clewiston. Relief organizations and local mayors distributed milk, biscuits, and coffee to evacuees. On the west coast of the state, some residents covered their windows, but many others did not, anticipating little damage from the weak storm. Citizens received radio updates from the Weather Bureau, which gave the position and movement of the storm. Some beachfront residents, such as in Sarasota, left their homes for safety, while boaters secured their vessels.

In Texas, the Weather Bureau notified people early enough to allow mass evacuations: most coastal residents and camping visitors evacuated the vulnerable islands as the storm neared. Between 60 and 70% of Port Isabel's 500 residents left before the storm, with the remainder sheltering in a sturdy brick store on the highest land available.

Impact
Throughout the hurricane's path from the Caribbean, to Florida, and finally into Texas and Mexico, 39 people were killed. Thirty-one deaths occurred in Mexico, six in Saint Kitts, and one in both the Bahamas and Texas. Although figures from Mexico were unavailable, total losses from the storm in the United States reached about $3 million, inclusive of Florida and Texas, though figures for the latter state varied from $500,000 to $1.75 million, according to various sources.

Caribbean

As it passed over the Lesser Antilles, the storm caused at least six deaths on the island of Saint Kitts—then known as Saint Christopher Island—and the Virgin Islands reported torrential rains, though no damage was reported. Crops and farm fencing on Saint Croix sustained some damage, though overall effects were limited. Coincidentally, the storm arrived the day after Hurricane Supplication Day, a local tradition marking the opening of hurricane season on the fourth Monday in July. In the Bahamas, winds of  swept the Abaco Islands early on July 29, but caused only minimal damage there. Other reports indicated more severe damage elsewhere in the islands, including across the Turks and Caicos Islands, and one death from drowning. The American schooner Adams, anchored off Grand Turk, was dragged out to sea by the hurricane's waves.

Florida
Wind damage was generally minimal as the small hurricane crossed Florida, except to citrus crops and snapped vegetation in some areas. According to a survey by local fire officials, the calm eye was observed from Hobe Sound to the edge of Stuart, during which passage "hardly a needle in pine trees along the side of the road could be seen moving." Peak winds estimated or registered at  affected the coast between Stuart and Fort Pierce. The winds downed several telegraph poles and destroyed a structure at Stuart, but otherwise little damage resulted. Initial reports from Fort Pierce signaled no uprooted trees. Farther south, apart from a snapped coconut palm, the town of Palm Beach evinced little damage to foliage. In Fort Pierce, heavier losses to grapefruit were accounted at about 25%, especially in exposed groves, and some trees suffered total loss of fruit. Shrubs and roofs in the city were damaged as well, but power and water services were quickly revived as the worst of the storm passed. Final losses to citrus in the Indian River region were tallied at 10–20%, with much greater tolls locally. Avocado and mango trees also sustained significant damage. A minimum pressure of  occurred in Stuart, the same as in Jupiter—both unusually high for a hurricane, though likely related to the storm's small size.

Despite the relatively modest winds, prolific rains attended the cyclone. A rain gauge at the Palm Beach Post office in West Palm Beach counted  on July 30–31, setting a 24-hour record at that location— above the daily maximum for the week of the 1928 Okeechobee hurricane. This established a monthly record as well, the total being  for July. Other rain gauges, such as one that blew over in Fort Pierce, failed to measure the true totals, which were likely underestimated. Floodwaters submerged all but the highest land on a nearby golf course, which was navigable only by boat. The copious rains submerged roads and rural countryside in Palm Beach, Martin, and St. Lucie counties, but did not render highways impassible for traffic. Floodwaters shut down a bridge in town, and aside from a West Palm Beach commuter, bus drivers were the only motorists on flooded roads. The Post described the predicament of Matt Platt, the commuter from West Palm Beach, as he entered Jupiter:
Trains were getting through but travel by car in any direction was almost taboo. [...] Water ... at times was up to the lights on his car, [and he] was the only person to drive into the town Monday [July 31]...
–Palm Beach Post, August 1, 1933

Reports from Jupiter detailed a town almost "cut off" by floodwaters. A washout affected a  section of track bed on the Florida East Coast Railway in Port Salerno, halting three passenger trains for a combined 7.5 hours. Nearby, floodwaters stranded two Florida Motor Lines buses as water rose to cover the floors. Relief vehicles later transported passengers on their way. African-American communities in Stuart reported severe flooding as well, and torrential rains formed potholes in streets in West Palm Beach. The rains demonstrated that local communities could be stranded, causing funds to be expedited toward bridge repairs on the Loxahatchee River near Jupiter. Flooding in some areas was the worst since a hurricane in October 1924. Winds disrupted communications with small settlements, and Stuart was unreachable for many hours. Loose branches falling on power lines temporarily disrupted electricity in Palm Beach, where flooding affected low-lying ground. The effects were similar to those attending earlier storms. Sewers in West Palm Beach backed up, causing water to seep over Dixie Highway at several spots. Several cars were stranded while attempting to navigate flooded streets. Despite inconveniences, residents made good humor of the elements: newspapers noted that a parrot lost shortly before the storm was spotted in a tree, uninjured, and returned to its owner.

Inland, the storm caused no appreciable effects as it mostly crossed sparsely settled areas. Winds at Okeechobee reached  as the center moved south of that town early on July 31. Additional heavy rains fell over the west coast of Florida, but to a lesser extent than on the east; as was the case elsewhere, notable wind damage was almost non-existent. Little immediate damage from wind and rain resulted in the Everglades and near Lake Okeechobee. In St. Petersburg, citizens enjoyed a refreshing northeast breeze that removed dead fronds from palms, uprooted scattered plants, and sent waves splashing over seawalls. An anemometer operated by United States Airways at Grand Central Airport, a now-defunct airport on Weedon Island, clocked  winds.

Texas and Mexico
As the hurricane affected Brownsville, strong winds—estimated at —rent apart tree limbs, tore off roofs, and cracked plate glass windows. Debris covered streets in nearby Port Isabel, where waterfront fishing huts were wrecked. High seas also destroyed many structures on South Padre Island and partly submerged Padre and Brazos islands. High tides eroded  of highway on Brazos. Almost no building in Port Isabel went unscathed, with poorly built structures flattened; among the worst hit were at a development company. Early reports confirmed that airborne glass from the local courthouse mildly injured a man in Brownsville. The storm also disrupted communications between the Texas mainland and the barrier islands, where high tides stranded 25–30 campers and a detachment of cavalry from Fort Brown. Two hangars in Brownsville collapsed from the winds as well. A smokestack at a canning facility in La Feria collapsed under the strain of high winds. The storm ruined between 8–10% of the citrus crop in the Rio Grande Valley, and caused at least one death in Texas. Localized losses to the citrus crop reached 25% and upwards of 50% of the cotton crop was blown away in the lower valley region. Total crop damage reached $2 million.

In Mexico, the storm produced torrential rains that resulted in severe flooding, particularly in riparian areas along and near the Santa Catarina River in Monterrey, where at least 31 people died as floods made more than a quarter of the city inaccessible. The collapse of a bridge isolated the Colonia Independencia. Raging waters destroyed 300 homes in one section alone, forcing occupants to flee, and the number of homeless reached the "thousands." Governor Lázaro Cárdenas and Mayor Calles called upon all city and state facilities for relief efforts. Many people required evacuation by boat in what were described as "thrilling rescues." The effects of the storm prostrated electrical and communications lines as well as trees in the city. Nearer to the coast, strong winds severely damaged the famed Teatro Reforma, a theater dating to the Maximilian era of the 1860s, in Matamoros, Tamaulipas, where many homes were destroyed.

See also
1909 Monterrey hurricane – Caused catastrophic flooding along the Santa Catarina River in Mexico, claiming 4,000 lives
1924 Cuba hurricane – Produced heavy rainfall over parts of South Florida, including the worst flooding in some areas until July 1933
1933 Treasure Coast hurricane – Was the second hurricane to hit the Treasure Coast in 1933, delivering stronger winds and more adverse effects to the area
1933 Cuba–Brownsville hurricane – Was a former Category 5 cyclone that hit South Texas within 24 hours of the preceding storm with  winds

References

F (1933)
F (1933)
F (1933)
F (1933)
F (1933)
F (1933)
Category 1 Atlantic hurricanes